The Twenty-sixth Oklahoma Legislature was a meeting of the legislative branch of the government of Oklahoma, composed of the Oklahoma Senate and the Oklahoma House of Representatives. The state legislature met in regular session at the Oklahoma State Capitol in Oklahoma City from January 8 to May 29, 1957, during the term of Governor Raymond D. Gary.

Dates of session
January 8 to May 29, 1957
Previous: 25th Legislature • Next: 27th Legislature

Leadership

House of Representatives

Democratic
Speaker of the House: Bill Harkey
Speaker Pro Tempore: Arthur Kelly
Majority Floor Leader: James Bullard

Republican
Minority Leader: Robert Alexander

Members

Senate

Table based on 2005 Oklahoma Almanac.

House of Representatives

Table based on government database.

Staff
Chief Clerk of House: Ellen Wilson

References

Oklahoma legislative sessions
1957 in Oklahoma
1958 in Oklahoma
1957 U.S. legislative sessions
1958 U.S. legislative sessions